H. giganteus may refer to:
 Hagryphus giganteus, an oviraptorosaurian theropod dinosaur species from the Upper Cretaceous Period of what is now Utah
 Helianthus giganteus, the giant sunflower or tall sunflower, a plant species native to the eastern United States
 Hemidactylus giganteus, the giant leaf-toed gecko, a lizard species found in India
 Herpetosiphon giganteus, a bacterium species
 Hirundapus giganteus, the brown-backed needletail, a large swift species